Finnish Sign Language is the sign language most commonly used in Finland. There are 3,000 (2012 estimate) Finnish deaf who have Finnish Sign Language as a first language. As the Finnish system records users by their written language, not their spoken alone, nearly all deaf people who sign are assigned this way and may be subsumed into the overall Finnish language figures. Historically the aim was oralism, whereby deaf people were taught to speak oral Finnish, even if they could not hear it; thus older people are recorded under these figures. In 2014, only 500 people registered Finnish Sign Language as their first language. There are several sign languages that come under this label; FSL for those that can see; Signed Finnish, which does not follow the same grammatical rules, and a version for those who are blind and deaf. Thus, there are around 8,000 people that use a Finnish Sign Language linguistically. Many estimates say 5,000, but these are exaggerations derived from the 14,000 deaf people in Finland (many of whom do not speak Finnish Sign Language). Finnish Sign Language is derived from Swedish Sign Language, which is a different language from Finnish Swedish Sign Language (which is Swedish Finnish language derived from Finnish Sign Language, of which there are an estimated 90 speakers in Finland), from which it began to separate as an independent language in the middle of the 19th century.

Finnish legislation recognized Finnish Sign Language as one of Finland's domestic languages in 1995 when it was included in the renewed constitution. Finland then became the third country in the world to recognize a sign language as a natural language and the right to use it as a mother tongue.

Courses in "sign language" have been taught in Finland since the 1960s. At that time, instruction taught signs but followed Finnish word order (see Manually Coded Language). Later, as research on sign languages in general and Finnish Sign Language in particular determined that sign languages tend to have a very different grammar from oral languages, the teaching of Finnish Sign Language and Signed Finnish diverged.

See also 

 Carl Oscar Malm, founder of Finnish Sign Language

References

Relevant literature
Kanto, Laura, Henna Syrjälä, and Wolfgang Mann. "Assessing vocabulary in deaf and hearing children using Finnish Sign Language." The Journal of Deaf Studies and Deaf Education 26, no. 1 (2021): 147–158.
Takkinen, Ritva. "10. The Acquisition of Finnish Sign Language." In Research in Logopedics, pp. 175–205. Multilingual Matters, 2008.

External links
 Finnish Sign Language dictionary (in Finnish)
 Draft Curriculum and Structure of Finnish Sign Language (PDF download, in English) – contains useful information on the grammar of Finnish Sign Language
Finnish Manual Alphabet
Report on Finnish Languages 2017

Swedish Sign Language family
Sign languages in Finland
Languages of Finland